Iwahashi is a Japanese surname. Notable people with the surname include:

, Japanese writer
, Japanese field hockey player
, Japanese scientist and optician

Japanese-language surnames